Alison Stewart Lurie (September 3, 1926December 3, 2020) was an American novelist and academic.  She won the Pulitzer Prize for Fiction for her 1984 novel Foreign Affairs. Although better known as a novelist, she wrote many non-fiction books and articles, particularly on children's literature and the semiotics of dress.

Life
Alison Stewart Lurie was born on September 3, 1926, in Chicago, and raised in White Plains, New York. Her father Harry Lawrence Lurie was a sociologist, and her mother Bernice Lurie (née Stewart) was a journalist and book critic. Her father was born in Latvia and her mother was born in Scotland. Her father served as the First Executive Director of the National Council of Jewish Federations and Welfare Funds. Due to complications with a forceps delivery, she was born deaf in one ear and with damage to her facial muscles. She attended a boarding school in Darien, Connecticut, and graduated from Radcliffe College in 1947 with a bachelor's degree in history and literature.

Lurie met literary scholar Jonathan Peale Bishop while in college, and they married in 1948. Bishop later taught at Amherst College and Cornell University, and Lurie moved along with him. They had three sons and divorced in 1984. She then married the writer Edward Hower. She spent part of her time in London, part in Ithaca, and part in Key West, Florida.

In 1970, Lurie began to teach in the English department at Cornell, where she was tenured in 1979. She taught children's literature and writing. In 1976, she was named the F. J. Whiton Professor of American Literature at Cornell, and upon retirement, professor emerita. In 1981, she published The Language of Clothes, a non-fiction book about the semiotics of dress. Her discussion in Language of Clothes has been compared to Roland Barthes' The Fashion System (1985).

Lurie died from natural causes while under hospice care in Ithaca, New York, on December 3, 2020, at age 94.

Themes
Lurie's novels often featured professors in starring roles, and were frequently set at academic institutions. With their light touch and focus on portraying the emotions of well-educated adulterers, her works bear more resemblance to some 20th-century British authors (such as Kingsley Amis and David Lodge) rather than to the major American authors of her generation. A 2003 profile of Lurie, styled as a review of her Boys and Girls Forever, a work of criticism, observed that Lurie's works are often "witty and astute comedies of manners". Lurie noted that her writing was grounded in a "desire to laugh at things".

Literary critic John W. Aldridge gave a mixed assessment of Lurie's oeuvre in The American Novel and the Way We Live Now (1983). He notes that Lurie's work "has a satirical edge that, when it is not employed in hacking away at the obvious, is often eviscerating", but also remarks that "there is … something hobbled and hamstrung about her engagement in experience".

Although better known as a novelist, she wrote many non-fiction books and articles, particularly on children's literature and the semiotics of dress.

Bibliography

Novels 

Love and Friendship (1962)
The Nowhere City (1966)
Imaginary Friends (1967)
Real People (1969)
The War Between the Tates (1974)
Only Children (1979)
Foreign Affairs (1984)
The Truth About Lorin Jones (1988)
Women and Ghosts (1994)
The Last Resort (1998)
Truth and Consequences (2005)

Children's collections 
The Oxford Book of Modern Fairy Tales (1975)
Clever Gretchen and Other Forgotten Folktales (1980)
Fabulous Beasts
The Heavenly Zoo
The Black Geese
The Cat Agent (2023)

Non-fiction 
The Language of Clothes (1981)
Don't Tell the Grown-Ups (1990)
Familiar Spirits (2001)
Boys and Girls Forever (2003)
The Language of Houses: How Buildings Speak to Us (2014):
Words and Worlds: From Autobiographies to Zippers (2019)

Awards and honors
 1963–1964: Yaddo Foundation fellow
 1965: Guggenheim Foundation fellow
 1966: Yaddo Foundation fellow
 1967: Rockefeller Foundation fellow
 1978: American Academy of Arts and Letters literary award
 1985: Pulitzer Prize for fiction
 1989: Prix Femina Étranger
 1989: elected member of the American Academy of Arts and Letters
 2005: elected member of the American Academy of Arts and Sciences
 2006: University of Oxford honorary degree
 2007: University of Nottingham honorary degree
 2012–2014: New York State Author

Notes

References

Further reading

External links

1926 births
2020 deaths
20th-century American novelists
20th-century American women writers
21st-century American novelists
21st-century American women writers
American women novelists
Children's literature criticism
Cornell University faculty
Fellows of the American Academy of Arts and Sciences
American literary critics
American women literary critics
Members of the American Academy of Arts and Letters
Novelists from Illinois
Novelists from New York (state)
People from White Plains, New York
Prix Femina Étranger winners
Pulitzer Prize for Fiction winners
Radcliffe College alumni
Writers from Chicago
Writers from Ithaca, New York
American women academics